Travis Mathews (born 1975) is an American director and screenwriter. Primarily working within the documentary genre, his credits include the films I Want Your Love, Interior. Leather Bar. and Discreet, and the web series In Their Room.

Mathews lives and works in San Francisco.

Selected filmography
 Discreet (2017)

References

External links

American male screenwriters
American documentary filmmakers
American gay writers
LGBT film directors
American LGBT screenwriters
Living people
Writers from San Francisco
1975 births
Film directors from San Francisco
Screenwriters from California